Powalice  is a village in the administrative district of Gmina Ińsko, within Stargard County, West Pomeranian Voivodeship, in north-western Poland.

The village has a population of 3.

References

Powalice